The Tasado Line is a non-electrified standard-gauge secondary line of the Korean State Railway in North P'yǒngan Province, North Korea, running from Ryongch'ŏn on the P'yŏngŭi Line to Tasado Port.

History
The Tasado Line was opened by the Tasado Railway on 31 October 1939, as a  line from Sinŭiju to Tasado Port via Yangsi, to provide the Oji Paper Company's plant in Sinŭiju (today the Sinŭiju Chemical Fibre Complex a means of shipping its products out via the port at Tasado, as the Yalu River freezes in winter. The Sinŭiju–Yangsi section of the line was transferred to the Chosen Government Railway on 1 April 1943 as the Yangsi Line.

After the partition of Korea the line was within the territory of the DPRK; Yangsi Station was given its current name, Ryongch'ŏn Station some time after the partition. The line suffered considerable damage during the Korean War, including the destruction of the bridge west of Pukchung; this was rebuilt in September 1971, restoring service on the entirety of the line.

Services

At Pukchung the line serves the Pukchung Machine Complex factory, while beyond the station at the town of Tasado, it continues on to serve the Korean People's Navy base at Tasado Port. Coal, metal and metal products, fertilisers, agricultural products and materials required at the navy base are the major commodities shipped on the line.

There are five daily return commuter trains between Ryongch'ŏn and Tasado.

Route
A yellow background in the "Distance" box indicates that section of the line is not electrified.

References

Railway lines in North Korea
Standard gauge railways in North Korea